Sir Alexander Mackenzie Elementary School (SAM) is a school in St. Albert, Alberta, Canada, and is a part of St. Albert Public Schools. Opened in 1959, Alexander Mackenzie was the first Protestant school in St. Albert, and was the first school opened by its board. It was named after Alexander Mackenzie, a Scottish explorer who crossed what is now Canada. The school currently has an enrollment of 530 students.

Programs

Kindergarten 
Like all elementary schools within the St. Albert Public Schools district, SAM offers a Kindergarten program for children of at least five years in age. The Kindergarten program prepares students for entrance into the first grade by developing relationship and problem solving skills, as well as providing a foundation in language, writing, and the arts.

Academic Challenge 
The academic challenge program is designed for students who excel in their studies and require an additional challenge compared to what would be provided in a regular classroom setting. The program is intended for students with increased ability in areas such as abstract thought and creative thinking. The academic challenge program is offered to students in grades 4–6, and participants must be recommended to the program by the school. Qualification tests are required for entrance into the program.

History 
Sir Alexander Mackenzie School was the first school built by its parent school board, then known as Protestant Separate School District No. 6, and was the first Protestant school in St. Albert. Both the district and the school were created in order to accommodate a growing population of Protestant students in St. Albert. SAM was built in 1958 and opened for its first classes in January 1959. Its opening was originally planned for the start of the school year in September 1958, but due to disagreements between the architect of the school and the city of St. Albert's building inspectors, the building was not completed until the school year had already been underway. As a result, the school's 98 grade 1 to 7 students and nine teaching staff were forced to hold classes in the basement of the St. Albert United church instead.

Two different sites were considered: "River Lot 50," and "site 3," with the school being built on the former. The latter would eventually become the site of the district's first high school, Paul Kane. The ten acres of land that the school was to occupy was purchased at a cost of $10,000 an acre, with the total cost of the school coming to $374,243 to build.

Sir Alexander Mackenzie School was named after Sir Alexander Mackenzie, a Scottish explorer who explored much of what is now Canada. The name was chosen by submission and picked by committee, the choice of which would start a tradition within the district of choosing the names of historical figures for its schools.

The school did not always house only elementary students. Until the opening of the district's first high school, at points Alexander Mackenzie hosted grades up to 11. After the opening of Paul Kane, the school became an elementary-junior high school. It wasn't until 1973 that the school would gain its status as Sir Alexander Mackenzie Elementary School, hosting students from Kindergarten to grade 6.

An open area was added to the school in 1970, which would later be divided into a library and new classrooms.

By 1984 the school had 425 students and 32 staff members, 21 of which were teachers. Presently, the school has 530 students.

In 2012, Sir Alexander Mackenzie Elementary School's school district became public at the request of the Alberta government. As a result, SAM is no longer a Protestant school.

References 

Elementary schools in Alberta
Schools in St. Albert, Alberta
1959 establishments in Alberta
Educational institutions established in 1959